Roland Grapow (born 30 August 1959 in Hamburg) is a German guitarist and music producer. He is best known for his time in the power metal band Helloween, with which he played for twelve years, after replacing founding member Kai Hansen. He subsequently created the power metal band Masterplan in 2001, which is still active today.

Life and career

Early years
Grapow started playing guitar at age 12. His father bought him a guitar and had him take lessons, but Grapow couldn't stand the theory part and his teacher told his father that the boy didn't have any talent for guitar playing.

Helloween
Prior to joining Helloween, Grapow was a member of the heavy metal band Rampage. He joined the band in roughly 1979, and played on two of their studio albums: Victim of Rock in 1980 and Love Lights Up the Night in 1982. He left Rampage around 1983. He was then fairly inactive musically, and made a living as a car mechanic until Michael Weikath called him to offer him a position in Helloween in 1989. According to Grapow in 2017, "If Weiki didn't call me at that time, I would still be a car mechanic and I'd be an old guy with heavy bones and pain, still working on cars, dreaming about my hobby I had a long time ago, being a musician."
Grapow played on the Helloween albums Pink Bubbles Go Ape, Chameleon, Master of the Rings, The Time of the Oath, High Live, Better Than Raw, Metal Jukebox, and The Dark Ride.

Solo work, Masterplan
During his time with the band, Grapow also formed a solo project. The first release, The Four Seasons of Life, featured members of Helloween playing backup, with Grapow trying his hand at singing in addition to playing guitar. On the second album, Kaleidoscope, current and former members of Yngwie Malmsteen's band participated.

In 2001, Grapow and bandmate Uli Kusch were fired from Helloween due to musical and personal differences. In 2012, in an interview with Metal Shock Finland's chief editor Mohsen Fayyazi, Grapow stated: 

Grapow and Kusch decided to go on with the side project they had been planning and formed the band Masterplan with former Ark and the Snakes singer Jørn Lande. After Kusch left the band in 2006, Grapow became the leader and main songwriter of Masterplan.

Production work
Grapow resides in Zvolenská Slatina, Slovakia, where he runs his own musical studo—Grapow Studios. Among many other projects, Grapow produced Czech metalcore band X-Core's 2008 album In Hell as well as their 2011 follow-up, Life and Stuff.

In 2011, he mixed the album Motherland for the Italian progressive metal band Daedalus and played the guitar solo on the song "Underground".

In 2012, Czech power metal band Eagleheart recorded their second album, Dreamtherapy, for Scarlet Records, with Grapow producing, mixing, mastering, and contributing guest vocals and guitar solos.

He also produced Slovak symphonic metal band Anthology's album The Prophecy.

He has worked extensively with Spanish power metal band Lords of Black, producing their albums Lords of Black and II.

Kreyson
In 2017, Grapow joined Czech metal band Kreyson as their lead guitarist. In 2019, he announced his departure from the band.

Partial discography

References

External links
 

1959 births
Living people
Musicians from Hamburg
German male guitarists
German heavy metal guitarists
Rhythm guitarists
Helloween members
Masterplan (band) members
German expatriates in Slovakia